Geevor Tin Mine (from , meaning "mine of the goats"), formerly North Levant Mine is a tin mine in the far west of Cornwall, United Kingdom, between the villages of Pendeen and Trewellard. It was operational between 1911 and 1990 during which time it produced about 50,000 tons of black tin. It is now a museum and heritage centre left as a living history of a working tin mine. The museum is an Anchor Point of ERIH, The European Route of Industrial Heritage. Since 2006, the mine has been part of the UNESCO World Heritage Site Cornwall and West Devon Mining Landscape.

History 
Tin and copper have been mined from the general area of Geevor since the late 18th century. It was originally a small enterprise known as Wheal an Giver, "a piece of ground occupied by goats". The area was worked under the name of East Levant Mine until 1840 and then as North Levant from 1851 to 1891 when it closed. During the 1880s as many as 176 workers were employed at the mine, but in the ten years after North Levant's closure the site saw only intermittent activity by a few miners.

At the turn of the 20th century a group of St. Just miners who had emigrated to South Africa were forced to return by the outbreak of the Second Boer War. They leased the area and conducted more thorough prospecting, being encouraged enough to set up a company called Levant North (Wheal Geevor) in 1901. This was acquired by the West Australian Gold Field Company Ltd. in 1904 which brought together various mines under the name of Geevor Tin Mines Ltd. in 1911, not long after the price of tin had rapidly risen to £181 a ton in 1906 from a low of £64 in 1896.

The Wethered shaft (named after Oliver Wethered, one of the founders of the mine) was begun in 1909 and initial development occurred around it. By 1919, the works were moving west toward the coastline and the Victory shaft (named to celebrate the end of the First World War) was sunk about 540 metres to the north-west. The mine suspended operations in 1921 and again for 12 months during the tin crisis in 1930 that permanently closed many other Cornish mines. In 1944 working through Wethered shaft was discontinued, but the Victory shaft continued in use. 

From the end of World War II until the early 1960s both Geevor and South Crofty found it hard to raise capital and to recruit skilled miners. Both mines took on Polish and Italian miners at this time. New investment, forward-looking management and rising tin prices in the 1960s improved matters and at this time around 270 staff were employed by the mine. During the 1960s there was much underground exploration; this included extending into the undersea workings of the Levant mine that had closed in 1930, work that was complicated by a hole in the seabed that first had to be plugged before the workings could be drained.

By the 1970s Geevor's sett covered an area of about three square miles and included Boscaswell Downs mine, Pendeen Consols and Levant mine. In 1985 the International Tin Council failed and there was a dramatic fall in the price of the metal. The mine struggled on for a few years, but closed in 1990, and the pumps were switched off in May 1991 allowing the workings to flood. The mine is not geologically exhausted of tin, but it is exhausted of tin that is recoverable economically.

On average over a million gallons of water, a quarter of which was sea-water, was pumped from the mine daily.

Geology
The mine's lodes were located in an outer zone of coarse-grained biotite granite of Carboniferous age, intruded into surrounding Devonian age "killas" - a series of metamorphosed sedimentary and volcanic rocks, visible to the north west of the mine around the cliffs. As the influence of the granitic emplacement increases toward the contact zone, the killas becomes spotted with cordierite, then mica-rich phyllites and finally at the contact, banded hornfels and tourmaline schist.

The tin appears as cassiterite (with around 65-70% tin), within veins associated with quartz, tourmaline, metal sulphides and fluorite. The veins are predominantly in a north west - south east orientation and the cassiterite itself forms around 1% of the vein material.

Tourist attraction

Through the commitment of the local community and local bodies, notably Cornwall County Council and Pendeen Community Heritage, the site has remained accessible to the public. It is an important part of the Cornwall and West Devon Mining Landscape and was recognised by UNESCO in 2006. It has been the subject of a £3.8 million improvement programme funded by the Heritage Lottery Fund, Objective One, Cornwall County Council and Penwith District Council.

Geevor's new Hard Rock museum is part of the final stage of this improvement programme. The museum tells the story of tin mining in Cornwall and Geevor in particular, showing what happened on the surface and underground and what life was like for those who worked there, including oral history recordings. Visitors can also walk through the mine buildings to see the original machinery and there is a guided underground tour into Wheal Mexico, an 18th-century mine. The site has a souvenir shop and a cafe that overlooks the Atlantic Ocean. There are interactive activities e.g. panning for gold and gemstones.

See also 

 List of topics related to Cornwall
 Mining in Cornwall and Devon
 Dartmoor tin-mining
 South Crofty Tin Mine

References

Sources

Geevor: Proceedings of the 9th Commonwealth Mining and Metallurgical Congress, May 1969.

Further reading

External links 

 Geevor Tin Mine Museum
 Geevor blog
 Geevor on flickr
 Geevor page at Cornish Mining
 Cornwall Record Office Online Catalogue for Geevor
 Mindat.org information page, with list of minerals found at Geevor

Tin mines in Cornwall
European Route of Industrial Heritage Anchor Points
Mining museums in Cornwall
Industrial archaeological sites in Cornwall
St Just in Penwith